Greece competed at the 2008 Summer Olympics in Beijing, People's Republic of China. They were represented by the Hellenic Olympic Committee, which announced on July 28, 2008, the 156 Greek athletes to compete in Beijing, composed of 84 men and 72 women, the largest Greek Olympic team ever excluding the home team of the Athens 2004 Olympics. Greece took part in archery, athletics, basketball, boxing, canoeing, cycling, diving, gymnastics, judo, rowing, sailing, shooting, swimming, synchronized swimming, table tennis, taekwondo, tennis, triathlon, beach volleyball, water polo, weightlifting and wrestling.

As the progenitor nation of the Olympic Games, and in keeping with tradition, Greece entered the Beijing National Stadium first during the opening ceremony, led by the judoka Ilias Iliadis, who won a gold medal at the 2004 Summer Olympics in Athens.

The Greek team was originally awarded two silver and two bronze medals. In all four medal cases there was participation by athletes who were also medalists at the 2004 Summer Olympics in Athens (in the case of groups, at least one of their members was a former medalist).

Alexandros Nikolaidis won a second olympic silver medal, Vasileios Polymeros was second after his third place in Athens (along with Dimitrios Mougios), while the golden medalist of 2004 Sofia Bekatorou led the yngling class team to the third place. Hrysopiyi Devetzi was third, but eight years later (2016) she was disqualified by IAAF and the IOC and had her Olympic bronze medal annulled due to stanozol use.

Medalists

Archery

Greece will send archers to the Olympics for the third time, seeking the nation's first Olympic medal in the sport. Elpida Romantzi earned the country its first qualifying spot, in the women's competition, by placing 36th in the 2007 World Outdoor Target Championships. Evangelia Psarra placed third at the European qualifying tournament, giving Greece a second spot in the women's individual competition.

Athletics

Men
Track & road events

Field events

Women
Track & road events

Field events

Combined events – Heptathlon

Basketball

Greece qualified for the men's basketball tournament through the FIBA World Olympic Qualifying Tournament for Men 2008.

Men's tournament

Roster

Group play

Quarterfinals

Boxing

Greece qualified two boxers for the Olympic boxing tournament. Both qualified at the second European continental qualifying tournament.

Canoeing

Slalom

Sprint

Qualification Legend: QS = Qualify to semi-final; QF = Qualify directly to final

Cycling

Track
Greece will have entries in the men's Keirin and team sprint.

Sprint

Keirin

Diving

Gymnastics

Artistic 
Men

Women

Rhythmic

Judo

Rowing 

Men

Women

Qualification Legend: FA=Final A (medal); FB=Final B (non-medal); FC=Final C (non-medal); FD=Final D (non-medal); FE=Final E (non-medal); FF=Final F (non-medal); SA/B=Semifinals A/B; SC/D=Semifinals C/D; SE/F=Semifinals E/F; QF=Quarterfinals; R=Repechage

Sailing 

Men

Women

Open

M = Medal race; EL = Eliminated – did not advance into the medal race;

Shooting 

Men

Swimming 

Men

Women

Synchronized swimming

Table tennis

Singles

Team

Taekwondo

Tennis

Triathlon

Volleyball

Beach 
Greece has two teams in the women's Olympic beach volleyball tournament.

Water polo

Greece participated in both the men's and the women's tournaments. The men's team finished in 7th place, while the women's team finished in 8th place.

Men's tournament

Roster

Group play

All times are China Standard Time (UTC+8).

Classification quarterfinal

Classification semifinal

Classification 7th–8th

Women's tournament

Roster

Group play

All times are China Standard Time (UTC+8).

Classification 7th–8th

Weightlifting 

11 competitors were banned after testing positive for drugs.

Wrestling 

Men's freestyle

Men's Greco-Roman

See also
 Greece at the 2008 Summer Paralympics

References

Nations at the 2008 Summer Olympics
2008
Summer Olympics